James Lamb (1599–1664), was an English orientalist.

Lamb was educated at Brasenose College, Oxford; M.A., 1620; D.D. and prebendary of Westminster, 1660; bequeathed many of his books to the library of Westminster Abbey; manuscripts by him on oriental subjects in the Bodleian.

References

Dictionary of National Biography

1599 births
1664 deaths
English orientalists
Alumni of Brasenose College, Oxford
English male non-fiction writers